Santo Domingo de los Tsáchilas is a province in the Republic of Ecuador, created in October 2007 from territory previously in the province of Pichincha.

Overview
The name of the province refers to a local ethnic group, the Tsáchila, also known as the Colorados on account of the custom of the Tsáchilas (specially men) dyeing their hair with paste made from achiote plants.

The provincial capital is Santo Domingo. With a population of approximately 500,000 inhabitants in 2008, it is the fourth-largest city in Ecuador following Guayaquil, Quito, and Cuenca. Its population is growing rapidly as it has a rich trade and the largest livestock market in the country. Santo Domingo limits are: on the north and east Pichincha, to the northwest Esmeraldas, Manabi on the west, to the south Los Rios and to the southeast with Cotopaxi. Located 133 km west of Quito. Its usual temperature is around 21–33 °C in summer. During the winter, temperatures range around 23–32 °C and sometimes reach 36 °C. Its average temperature is 25.5 °C.

This province is shown as part of the mountainous area of the coast of the western mountains, historically known as the Province of Yumbo and the Hummingbird Capital. Located in the humid tropics of Latin America. On November 26, 2006 a consultation was carried out to determine and promote the status of province to the Central Government and the examiner. The provincialism was held on November 6, 2007. There is a conflict with the province of Esmeraldas in the jurisdiction of the Canton La Concordia.

Political division
When the province was established on November 6, 2007, it consisted of only Santo Domingo canton. The canton of La Concordia was added to the province on May 31, 2013. The city of Santo Domingo is the provincial capital, as well as the seat of Santo Domingo canton.

See also 
Provinces of Ecuador
Cantons of Ecuador

References

External links

 
Provinces of Ecuador
States and territories established in 2007